Lukáš Mensator (born August 18, 1984) is a Czech former professional ice hockey goaltender. He currently works as a goaltending coach for HC Baník Sokolov of the Chance Liga.

Mensator played in the Czech Extraliga with HC Karlovy Vary and HC Plzeň. He was selected by the Vancouver Canucks in the 3rd round (83rd overall) of the 2002 NHL Entry Draft.

References

External links

1984 births
HC Baník Sokolov players
Czech ice hockey goaltenders
EHC Freiburg players
Sportovní Klub Kadaň players
HC Karlovy Vary players
Living people
BK Mladá Boleslav players
HC Most players
Ottawa 67's players
People from Sokolov
Piráti Chomutov players
IHC Písek players
HC Plzeň players
Rytíři Kladno players
Vancouver Canucks draft picks
Sportspeople from the Karlovy Vary Region
Czech expatriate ice hockey players in Canada
Czech expatriate ice hockey players in Germany